Mario Anni (born 22 November 1943) is an Italian former racing cyclist. He rode in the 1970 Tour de France.

References

External links
 

1943 births
Living people
Italian male cyclists
Cyclists from Brescia